A sound chip is an integrated circuit (chip) designed to produce audio signals through digital, analog or mixed-mode electronics. Sound chips are typically fabricated on metal–oxide–semiconductor (MOS) mixed-signal chips that process audio signals (analog and digital signals, for both analog and digital data). They normally contain audio components such as oscillators, envelope controllers, samplers, filters, amplifiers, and envelope generators.

History
A number of sound synthesis methods for electronically producing sound were devised during the late 20th century. These include programmable sound generators (PSG), wavetable synthesis, and frequency modulation synthesis (FM synthesis). Such sound chips were widely used in arcade game system boards, video game consoles, home computers and digital synthesizers.

Since the late-1990s, pulse-code modulation (PCM) sampling has been the standard for many sound chips, as used in the Intel High Definition Audio (IHDA) standard of 2004. The PCM sampling method is used in many mobile phones and sound cards for personal computers. This widespread use is part of the digital sound revolution that started in the 1980s.

Types
There are multiple types of sound chips, which are divided based on their use.

 Programmable sound generators
 Synthesis
 Wavetable synthesis
 Frequency modulation synthesis
 Sampling
 Pulse-code modulation sampling

List of sound chips

Sound chips come in different forms and use a variety of techniques to generate audio signals. A list of all of the different sound chips produced by a certain company or manufacturer can be found in the List of sound chips article.

Applications
Sound chips are commonly used in various digital electronic devices, particularly personal computers (including sound cards and motherboards), video game systems (including arcade system boards and video game consoles), electronic musical instruments (including synthesizers, digital synthesizers and electronic keyboards), and digital telecommunications (including digital telephony, digital television, mobile phones and smartphones).

See also
 Digital audio
 List of sound card standards
 List of sound chips

External links
Sound generators of the 1980s home computers - includes a list of chips, pictures, links to datasheets, etc.

 
Video game music technology